W.I.A. Wounded in Action is a 1966 war film directed and written by Irving Sunasky.

Plot
The story of wounded soldiers at a military hospital in the Philippines during World War II.

References

External links

American war films
1966 films
1960s English-language films
1960s American films